Jack Lyons (4 April 1912 – 9 April 1988) was an  Australian rules footballer who played with Geelong in the Victorian Football League (VFL).

Notes

External links 

1912 births
1988 deaths
Australian rules footballers from Victoria (Australia)
Geelong Football Club players